Khazret Zhangeriyevich Dyshekov (born 24 August 1965) is a Russian professional football coach and former player.

Coaching career
On 7 June 2019, Russian Football Union banned him from football activity for one year after he accepted a 500,000 rubles bonus from FC Urozhay Krasnodar before the game of his team FC Chernomorets Novorossiysk against Urozhay's competitor FC Chayka Peschanokopskoye.

Honours
 Russian Second Division Zone South best manager: 2004, 2010.

Personal life
His son Zhangeri Dyshekov also became a professional football player.

References

External links
 

1965 births
People from Kabardino-Balkaria
Living people
Soviet footballers
Russian footballers
Russian Premier League players
FC Chernomorets Novorossiysk players
FC Kuban Krasnodar players
Russian football managers
FC Chernomorets Novorossiysk managers
FC Lada-Tolyatti managers
Russian Premier League managers
FC Volgar Astrakhan managers
FC Volga Nizhny Novgorod managers
FC Kaisar Kyzylorda managers
FC Baltika Kaliningrad managers
FC Armavir players
Association football forwards
Sportspeople from Kabardino-Balkaria